Morten Halsa was a Norwegian curler.

At the national level, he was a 1997 Norwegian men's champion curler.

Teams

References

External links

Living people
Norwegian male curlers
Norwegian curling champions
Place of birth missing (living people)
20th-century Norwegian people
1965 births